Candida, Millionairess is a 1941 Argentine musical comedy film directed by Luis Bayón Herrera, who adapted the Pedro E. Pico play.

Plot
A millionaire businessman falls in love with his Galician maid, and decides to marry her despite her daughter's opposition. She mistreats her and even makes her look like a thief, until the real motives are discovered.

Cast
Niní Marshall ...	Cándida 
Alberto Bello 
Armando Bo 
Osvaldo Miranda 
Pedro Vargas
Alejandro Maximino		
Lucy Galián		
Adrián Cúneo		
María Goicoechea		
Billy Days		
Maruja Vergara		
Susana Castilla		
Regina Laval		
Carlos Roller		
José Dorado		
Lina Estévez
 Vicente Forastieri		
 Los Rancheros

References

External links
 

1941 films
1940s Spanish-language films
Argentine black-and-white films
1941 musical comedy films
Films directed by Luis Bayón Herrera
Films about immigration to Argentina
1940s Argentine films